Rambler is an album by Hungarian guitarist Gábor Szabó featuring performances recorded in 1973 and released on the CTI label.

Reception
The Allmusic review states "For what would be Szabo's last significant recording, the Hungarian guitarist performs an obscurity and five of bassist Melz's originals... Although the individual melodies are not that memorable (none caught on), Gabor Szabo's distinctive sound and logical improvisations make this an album worth searching for".

Track listing
All compositions by Wolfgang Melz except as indicated
 "Rambler" - 5:25   
 "So Hard to Say Goodbye" - 4:42  
 "New Love" - 6:21   
 "Reinhardt" - 6:55   
 "Help Me Build a Lifetime" - 4:27   
 "All Is Well" (Robert Lamm) - 5:20   
Recorded at Van Gelder Studio in Englewood Cliffs, New Jersey in September 1973

Personnel
Gábor Szabó - guitar
Bob James - piano, organ, synthesizer, musical supervision
Mike Wofford - electric piano
Wolfgang Melz - bass
Bobby Morin - drums
Unknown - percussion

References

CTI Records albums
Gábor Szabó albums
1973 albums
Albums produced by Creed Taylor
Albums recorded at Van Gelder Studio